9E or 9-E can refer to:

9th meridian east
IATA code for Endeavor Air
List of highways numbered 9E
US 9E, or U.S. Route 9 in New York
US 9E (NJ), or U.S. Route 9 in New Jersey
SSH 9E (WA); see Washington State Route 104
Route 9E (WMATA); see List of Metrobus routes (Washington, D.C.)
AIM-9E, a model of AIM-9 Sidewinder
9e, French for 9th
Paris 9e (9e arrondissement), or 9th arrondissement of Paris
9e RIMA, or 9th Marine Infantry Regiment
9e Régiment de Chasseurs Parachutistes, or 9th Parachute Chasseur Regiment
HP 9E, Windows codepage 1250 in Hewlett-Packard printers

See also
E9 (disambiguation)
E9 (iloveyou)